Anton Karlsson may refer to:
 Anton Karlsson (ice hockey, born 1993)
 Anton Karlsson (ice hockey, born 1996)
 Anton Karlsson (golfer)
 Anton Karlsson (speedway rider)